Bola Bola is a Philippine teen romantic comedy  television miniseries with a tagline "Cook, Feed, Love, Repeat" based on the best selling romance-novel of the same name by Anna Geronga, starring Francine Diaz, together with Akira Morishita of the Filipino boy group BGYO, KD Estrada and Ashton Salvador, directed by JP Habac, who has worked also with the romance films "I'm Drunk, I Love You", "Sakaling Maging Tayo", "Dito At Doon" and the hit BL series "Gaya sa Pelikula". The series premiered on iWantTFC on March 26, 2022.

Synopsis

What happens when you fall in love with your Kuya's best friend? Thea Balderama, a 220-pound late bloomer, believes that she will never meet her mother's incredibly high standards for beauty. Worse, while Thea deals with her deep-seated insecurities about her weight, she must also study to get into her dream university while keeping up with her boy-crazy best friends. Her life becomes even more complicated when Lucas Benitez, her Kuya's best friend, (and her longtime crush!), returns from the States. As her attraction to Lucas grows, Thea cooks for him, pouring her passion into irresistible merienda, hoping to reach her crush’s heart through his stomach, in the hopes that he will think she's beautiful—fat and all. Though Thea knows nothing is a piece of cake, she has a hopeful heart, and she's hungry for love. Being with Lucas might just be worth the risk.

Cast and characters
All of the cast and characters are adapted from the trailer released by iWantTFC in YouTube, unless otherwise noted.

Main cast
 Francine Diaz as Thea Balderama
 Akira Morishita as Lucas Benitez
 KD Estrada as Julian Sarmiento
 Ashton Salvador as Josh Beltran

Supporting cast
 Arlene Muhlach as Anj Balderama
 Vance Larena as Anton Balderama
 Lito Pimentel as Ricardo Balderama
 J-Mee Katanyag as Cely
 Analain Salvador as Issa
 Danica Ontengco as Ivy

Episodes

Production

Background
The project was first announced on December 10, 2021, in a livestream event called as "iWantTFC Unwrapped".

Filming
In 2022, filming began and wrapped up on the same year.

Marketing
The official teaser was released on February 25, 2022 and the full trailer of the series was released on March 17, 2022, via iWantTFC's social media accounts. The main casts of the series graced Magandang Buhay on March 14, 2022 and the ASAP Natin 'To stage on March 20, 2022, as part of "Bola Bola" promotion.

Reception
Rafael Bautista of Nylon Manila shared in an article saying, "Bola Bola is opening up discussions of how body, weight loss, and what makes you happy isn't a one-dimensional discussion". He also praised the actors behind the series saying, "the show wouldn't impress if it weren't for the good acting from the cast, most especially Francine Diaz".

Soundtrack

On March 21, 2022 Star Music has revealed the official soundtrack of the series, and was released on March 25 of the same year.

Release

Broadcast
The series premiered on March 26, 2022, via iWantTFC.

The series had its Philippine TV Premiere beginning August 21 to September 4, 2022, airing on Sunday primetime on Kapamilya Channel and A2Z replacing the second season of He's Into Her and was replaced by Run To Me. It will also airing on ABS-CBN web channel Kapamilya Online Live and international via TFC (The Filipino Channel).

See also
 List of programs broadcast by ABS-CBN
 List of programs distributed by ABS-CBN
 List of programs broadcast by Kapamilya Channel
 List of programs broadcast by A2Z (Philippine TV channel)
 List of iWantTFC original programming
 List of ABS-CBN drama series

References

External links
 
 Bola Bola on iWantTFC
ABS-CBN drama series
iWantTFC original programming
Films based on Philippine novels
2022 web series debuts
2022 Philippine television series debuts
2022 Philippine television series endings
2022 web series endings